The 2020–21 Standard Liège season was the club's 117th season in existence and its ninth consecutive season in the top flight of Belgian football. In addition to the domestic league, Standard Liège participated in this season's edition of the Belgian Cup and participated in the UEFA Europa League. The season covered the period from 1 July 2020 to 30 June 2021.

Players

First-team squad

Out on loan

Transfers

In

Out

Pre-season and friendlies

Competitions

Overview

Belgian First Division A

Regular season

Results summary

Results by round

Matches
The league fixtures were announced on 8 July 2020.

Play-Off II

Results summary

Results by round

Matches

Belgian Cup

UEFA Europa League

Qualifying rounds

Group stage

The group stage draw was held on 2 October 2020.

Statistics

Squad appearances and goals
Last updated on 25 April 2021

|-
! colspan=14 style=background:#dcdcdc; text-align:center|Goalkeepers

|-
! colspan=14 style=background:#dcdcdc; text-align:center|Defenders

|-
! colspan=14 style=background:#dcdcdc; text-align:center|Midfielders

|-
! colspan=14 style=background:#dcdcdc; text-align:center|Forwards

|-
! colspan=14 style=background:#dcdcdc; text-align:center|Players who have made an appearance this season but have left the club

|}

Goalscorers

References

External links

Standard Liège seasons
Standard Liège
Standard Liège